Christopher Rolleston  (27 July 1817 – 9 April 1888) was an English-born colonial public servant in Australia.

Rolleston was born 27 July 1817 in Watnall, Nottinghamshire, the second son of Rev. John Rolleston and Elizabeth, .

A prominent colonial civil servant in New South Wales, Rolleston served as the Register-General of New South Wales (1855 – 1864).  During his time as registrar general he was responsible for the launch of compulsory registration of births, deaths and marriages. He also served in a range of previous roles including Commissioner of Crown Lands in the Darling Downs (1842-1853), private secretary to the Governor of New South Wales, Sir William Denison (1855), as well as auditor-general (1864-1883).

His commercial appointments included director, European Assurance Society, the Mercantile Bank of Sydney and the Australian Gas Light Company, and a superannuation fund commissioner.

He served as the president and later a trustee of the Australian Club. For his lifelong service to colonial New South Wales he was appointed CMG in 1879.

Legacy
A number of places in Queensland are named after him:

 The town of Rolleston in the Central Highlands Region
 Mount Rolleston in Felton in the Toowoomba Region on the Darling Downs

Publications 
 ''The Condition and Resources of New South Wales — A lecture delivered at Sydney, December 12, 1866. (1867)

References

External links
 Christopher Rolleston at the Australian Dictionary of Biography
 
 

1817 births
1888 deaths
Australian public servants
Companions of the Order of St Michael and St George
19th-century Australian public servants